Kiss of Life is the debut solo album by American singer-songwriter Siedah Garrett, released in 1988 on Quincy Jones's Qwest Records label.

Track listing
Side one
"K.I.S.S.I.N.G." (Dana Merino, Guy Babylon) – 5:24
"Refuse to Be Loose" (L.A. Reid, Babyface) – 4:19
"Innocent Side" (Clif Magness, Siedah Garrett) – 5:06
"Night of No Return" (Dwania Kyles, Mervine Grady) – 4:50

Side two
"Kiss of Life" (Barry Blue, Chris Birkett) – 3:49
"Groove of Midnight" (Rod Temperton) – 4:40
"The Legend of Ruby Diamond" (Glen Ballard, Siedah Garrett) – 5:32
"Baby's Got It Bad" (Rod Temperton, Siedah Garrett) – 4:42
"Nobody Does Me" (Rod Temperton) – 6:06

On the vinyl version, tracks 1–4 are marked as "This Side", while tracks 5–9 are marked as "That Side". 
"Groove of Midnight" had been recorded as a demo by Michael Jackson during the 1986–87 Bad album sessions.
"Baby's Got It Bad" is a reworked version of "Got the Hots", a demo recorded by Michael Jackson during the 1982 Thriller album sessions (included as a bonus track on the Japanese release of Thriller 25).

Personnel

Musicians
Siedah Garrett – main vocals, backing vocals on tracks 1, 2 and 4–9
Kevin Dorsey, Jim Gilstrap, Maxine Waters, Nadirah Shakooi, Phillip Perry, Phillip Ingram, Bert Kelley, Mark Vieha, Rod Temperton – backing vocals
Amber Merino – "little girl" voice on track 1
David Banks – "old man" rap on track 7
Paul Jackson Jr., Basil Fung, Bruce Gaitsch, David Williams – guitars
Neil Stubenhaus – bass
John Robinson – drums, percussion
Guy Babylon, Babyface, Clif Magness, Randy Waldman, Randy Kerber – keyboards, synthesizers, synthesizer programming
George Duke – keyboards
Larry "Larr-Dog" Williams – synthesizers, synthesizer programming, saxophone
Daniel Higgins – saxophone
Gary Grant, Jerry Hey – trumpet and flugelhorn

Production
Adapted from Discogs.

Benny Medina – A&R direction
Michael Ostin – A&R direction
Lynn Robb – art direction
Karen Jones – A&R coordinator (4)
Beverly Lund – production coordinator
JoAnn Tominaga – production coordinator
Marsha Loeb – production coordinator
Tracee Augcomfar – design (Siedah's logo)
Matt Forger – engineer additional
Alex Welti – assistant engineer
Brad Sundberg – assistant engineer
Debbie Johnson – assistant engineer
Greg Loskorn – assistant engineer
Jim McMahon – assistant engineer
Mark Hagen – assistant engineer
Matt Pakucko – assistant engineer
Ric Butz – assistant engineer
Richard Piatt – assistant engineer
Ron DaSilva – assistant engineer
Tim Jacquette – assistant engineer
Tom Biener – assistant engineer
Quincy Jones – executive-producer
David Massey – management
Bernie Grundman – mastering
Craig Johnson – mastering (tracks: A3)
Mick Guzauski – mixing (tracks: A1, A2, A4 to B5)
Victoria Pearson – photography
Dick Rudolph – producer
Rod Temperton – producer
Craig Johnson – recording
John Van Nest – recording
Jim McMahon – technical direction

Charts

References

1988 debut albums
Qwest Records albums
Albums produced by Rod Temperton